Pleurisanthes is a genus of flowering plants belonging to the family Icacinaceae.

Its native range is Southern Tropical America.

Species:

Pleurisanthes artocarpi 
Pleurisanthes brasiliensis 
Pleurisanthes emarginata 
Pleurisanthes flava 
Pleurisanthes howardii 
Pleurisanthes parviflora 
Pleurisanthes simpliciflora

References

Icacinaceae
Asterid genera